Tenite is a brand of cellulosic thermoplastic materials produced by the Eastman Chemical Company.  Created in 1929, and trademarked in 1932, Tenite has been used in a wide variety of consumer, industrial, architectural and medical applications. Tenite cellulosics are manufactured from renewable raw materials (soft woods); they exhibit many of the same tactile and finish properties as wood, yet can easily be molded and extruded. Historically, applications for Tenite have varied from radios and telephones, to toys, toothbrushes and eyeglass frames.  Tenite is not a durable plastic.  Objects manufactured from Tenite slowly deform and warp over decades eventually rendering the products unusable.  Some formulations of Tenite are susceptible to surface mold.

History
In 1920, George Eastman established the site that would later become the headquarters for Eastman Chemical to provide a reliable domestic supply of compounds for Kodak's photographic processes. With the company's knowledge of acetyl chemistry for film production, Tennessee Eastman developed compounded cellulose acetate in 1929, which was sold under the Tenite cellulosics trade mark.  Over the next few decades new versions of Tenite were developed from mixed esters to meet a wider range of market requirements.

Production
Tenite cellulosics are prepared from cellulose acetate and its esters, and distributed as Tenite Acetate, Tenite Butyrate, and Tenite Propionate. Its mechanical, thermal, electrical, and optical properties may be tuned greatly with varying levels of plasticizers. Colorants are added for colored products. The material is processed into pellets for distribution. Downstream manufacturers mold or extrude the pellets into applications from eyeglass frames, tool handles and gun stocks to playing cards and casino dice.

Prior to World War II, Tenite was used by most American automakers to fashion steering wheels, dashboards, knobs, and handles.  During the war, 
Tenite was used to manufacture a wide range of military equipment, including weaponry, medical devices, musical instruments, indicator lights, and other uses.

Decay and Preservation Issues

Among the various uses for Tenite plastic included film reels for Kodak home movie stock. Film preservationists are discovering home movie reels made of Tenite that are decaying rapidly, with white powdery flakes covering the plastic surface. Not to be mistaken for mold, the powder from Tenite decay is considered hazardous and proper gear such as nitrile gloves are recommended for handling. Some film preservationists have claimed that working with this decaying plastic has caused "problems with their eyes, nose, throat and lungs despite taking appropriate handling precautions."

In order to prevent decay and prolong the life of Tenite materials, the National Park Service recommends these items be stored with a "stable temperature below 68°F; stable RH between 30%-40%. Well ventilate, segregate; use gas adsorbents if stored in closed container."

References

External links
 Eastman Chemical Company History | Kingsport TN
 
 
 Tenite 1940
 Newsfilm, Tenite, Home Movies, and More: An Interview with Margie Compton
 Care and Identification of Objects Made from Plastic

Thermoplastics